Cornuclepsis seminivea is a species of moth of the family Tortricidae. It is found in Costa Rica.

References

Archipini
Moths described in 2000
Moths of Central America
Taxa named by Józef Razowski